Stable and persistent phosphorus radicals are phosphorus-centred radicals that are isolable and can exist for at least short periods of time. Radicals consisting of main group elements are often very reactive and undergo uncontrollable reactions, notably dimerization and polymerization. The common strategies for stabilising these phosphorus radicals usually include the delocalisation of the unpaired electron over a pi system or nearby electronegative atoms, and kinetic stabilisation with bulky ligands. Stable and persistent phosphorus radicals can be classified into three categories: neutral, cationic, and anionic radicals. Each of these classes involve various sub-classes, with neutral phosphorus radicals being the most extensively studied. Phosphorus exists as one isotope 31P (I = 1/2) with large hyperfine couplings relative to other spin active nuclei, making phosphorus radicals particularly attractive for spin-labelling experiments.

Neutral phosphorus radicals 
Neutral phosphorus radicals include a large range of conformations with varying spin densities at the phosphorus. Generally, they can categorised as mono- and bi/di-radicals (also referred to as bisradicals and biradicaloids) for species containing one or two radical phosphorus centres respectively.

Monoradicals 
In 1966, Muller et. al published the first electron paramagnetic resonance (EPR/ESR) spectra displaying evidence for the existence of phosphorus-containing radicals. Since then a variety of phosphorus monoradicals have been synthesised and isolated. Common ones include phosphinyl (R2P•), phosphonyl (R2PO•), and phosphoranyl (R4P•) radicals.

Synthesis 
Synthetic methods for obtaining neutral phosphorus mondoradicals include photolytic reduction of trivalent phosphorus chlorides, P-P homolytic cleavage, single electron oxidation of phosphines, and cleavage of P-S or P-Se bonds.

The first persistent two-coordinate phosphorus-centred radicals [(Me3Si)2N]2P• and [(Me3Si)2CH]2P• were reported in 1976 by Lappert and co-workers. They are prepared by photolysis of the corresponding three-coordinate phosphorus chlorides in toluene in the presence of an electron-rich olifin.  In 2000, the Power group found that this species can be synthesised from the dissolution, melting or evaporation of the dimer.

In 2001, Grützmacher et al. reported the first stable diphosphanyl radical [Mes*MeP-PMes*]• (Mes = 1,3,5-trimethylbenzene) from the reduction of the phosphonium salt [Mes*MeP-PMes*]+(O3SCF3)-  in an acetonitrile solution containing tetrakis(dimethylamino)ethylene (TDE) at room temperature, yielding yellow crystals.  The monomer is stable below -30 ºC in the solid state for a few days. At room temperature the species decomposes in solution and in the solid state with a half life of 30 minutes at 3 x 10-2 M.

The first structurally characterised phosphorus radical [Me3SiNP(µ3-NtBu)3{µ3-Li(thf)}3X]• (X = Br, I) was synthesised by Armstrong et al. in 2004 by the oxidation of the starting material with halogens bromide or iodine in a mixture of toluene and THF at 297 K. This produces blue crystals that can be characterised by X-ray crystallography. The steric bulk of the alkyl-imido groups was identified as playing a major role in the stabilising of these radicals.
In 2006, Ito et al. prepared an air tolerant and thermally stable 1,3-diphosphayclobutenyl radical. Sterically bulky phospholkyne (Mes*C≡P) is treated with 0.5 equiv of t-BuLi in THF to form a 1,3 diphosphaalkyl anion. This is reduced with iodine solution to form a red product. The species is a planar four-membered diphosphacyclobutane (C2P2) ring with the Mes* having torsional angles with the C2P2 plane.

Metal stabilised radicals 
In 2007, Cummins et al. synthsised a phosphorus radical using nitridovanadium trisanilide metallo ligands with similar form to Lappert, Power and co-workers' "jack-in-the-box" diphosphines. This is made by the synthesis of the radical precursor ClP[NV{N(Np)Ar}]3]2 followed by its one electron reduction with Ti[N(tBu)Ar]3 or potassium graphite to yield dark brown crystals in 77% yield. EPR data showed delocalisation of electron spin across the two 51V and one 31P nuclei. This was consistent with computation, supporting the reported resonance structures. This delocalisation across the vanadium atoms was identified as the source of stabilisation for this species due to the ease for transition metals to undergo one-electron chemistry. Cummins and co-workers postulated that the p-character of the system could be tuned by changing the metal centres.

Other metals stabilised radicals have been reported by Scheer et al, and Schneider et al using ligand containing tungsten and osmium respectively.

Structure and properties 

As previously mentioned, kinetic stabilisation through bulky ligands has been an effective strategy for producing persisting phosphorus radicals. Delocalisation of the electron has also shown a stabilising effect on phosphorus radical species. This conversely results in more delocalised spin densities, and lower coupling constants relative to 31P localised electron spin. For this reason the spin localisation on the phosphorus atom varies widely for different phosphorus radical species.

Cyclic radicals like that by Ito at al have delocalisation across the rings. In this case X-ray, EPR spectroscopy, and ab initio calculations found that 80-90% of the spin was delocalised on the carbons in the C2P2 ring and the rest on the phosphorus atoms. Despite this, the aP2 constant shows similar spectroscopic property to organic radicals that contain conjugated P=C doubles bond, justifying the resonance structure used for this species.

The phosphinyl radicals synthesised by Lappert and co-workers were found to be stable at room temperature for periods of over 15 days with no effect from short-term heating at 360 K. This stability was assigned to the steric bulk of the substituents and the absence of beta-hydrogen atoms. A structural study of this species conducted using X-ray crystallography, gas-phase electron diffraction, and ab initio molecular orbital calculations found that the source of this stability was not the bulkiness of the CH(SiMe3)2 ligands but the release of strain energy during homolytic cleavage at the P-P bond of the dimer that favoured the existence of the radical. The dimer shows a syn,anti conformation, which allows for better packing but has excessive crowding at the trimethylsilyl groups, while the radical monomer displays syn,syn conformation. Theoretical calculations showed that the process of cleaving the P-P bond (endothermic), relaxation to release steric strain, and rotation about the P-C bond to yield syn,syn conformation on the monomer radical (exothermic by 67.5 kJ for each unit) is an overall exothermic process. The stability of this species can therefore be attributed to the energy release of strain energy by the reorganisation of the ligands as the dimer converts to the radical monomer. This effect have been observed in other systems containing the CH(SiMe3)2 ligand and was dubbed the "Jack-in-the-box" model. Other ligand with similar flexibility, and ability to undergo conformational changes were identified as PnR2 (Pn - P, As, Sb) and ERR'2 (E = Si, Ge, Sn; R' = bulky ligand).

In 2022, Brehm and co-workers investigated the electron density distribution across centres in metal-coordinated phosphanoxyl complexes. This study showed that tungsten-containing radical complexes have small amounts of spin density on the metal nuclei while in the case of manganese and iron, the spins are purely metal-centred.

Biradicals 
Biradicals are molecules bearing two unpaired electrons. These radicals can interact ferromagnetically (triplet), antiferromagnetically (open-shell singlet) or not interact at all (two-doublet).  Biradicaloids/diradicaloids are a class of biradicals with significant radical centre interaction.

Synthesis 
The first phosphorus biradical was reported in 2011 by T. Breweies and co-workers. The biradicaloid [P(µ-NR)]2 (R=Hyp, Ter) was synthesised by the reduction of cyclo-1,3-diphospha (III)-2,4-diazanes using [(Cp2TiCl}2] as the reducing agent.  The bulky Ter and Hyp substituents provide a large stabilising effect. This effect is more pronounced with Ter where the biradical is stable in inert atmospheres in the solid state for long periods of time at temperatures up to 224 C. Computational studies determined that the [P(µ-NTer)]2 radical shows an openshell singlet ground state biradical character.

Villinger et al later synthesised a stable cyclopentane-1,3-diyl biradical by the insertion of CO into a P–N bond of diphosphadiazanediyl.

In 2017 D. Rottschäfer et al reported a N-heterocyclic vinylindene-stabilised singlet biradicaloid phosphorus compound (iPr)CP]2 (iPr = 1,3-bis(2,6-diisopropylphenyl)imidazol-2-ylidene). Significant π-e- density is transferred to C2P2 ring. The species was found to be diamagnetic with temperature-independent NMR resonances, so can be considered a non-Kekulé molecule.

Structure and properties 
The species by Villinger can undergo reaction with phosphaalkyne forming a five-membered P2N2C heterocycle with a P-C bridge. It can also undergo halogenation and reaction with elemental sulfur.

Characterisation 

Phosphorus radicals are commonly characterized by EPR/ESR to elucidate the spin localisation of the radical across the radical species. Higher coupling constants are indicative of higher localisation on phosphorus nuclei. Quantum chemical calculations on these systems are also used to support this experimental data.

Before the characterization by X-ray crystallography by Armstrong et al, the structure of the phosphorus centred radical [(Me3Si)2CH]2P• had been determined by electron diffraction. The diphosphanyl radical  [Mes*MeP-PMes*]• had been stabilised through doping into crystals of Mes*MePPMeMes*. The radical synthesised by Armstrong et al was found to exist as a distorted PN3Li3X cube in the solid state. They found that upon dissolution in THF, this cubic structure is disrupted, leaving the species to form a solvent-separated ion pair.

Phosphorus radical cations

Synthesis 
Phosphorus radical cations are often obtained from the one-electron oxidation of diphosphinidenes and phosphalkenes.

In 2010, the Bertrand group found that carbene-stabilised diphosphinidenes can undergo one-electron oxidation in toluene with Ph3C+B(C6F5)4− at room temperature in inert atmosphere to produce radical cations (Dipp=2,6-Diisopropylphenyl).  The Bertrand group reported the synthesis of [(cAAC)P2]•+ , [(NHC)P2]•+ and [(NHC)P2]++ . The EPR signal for [(cAAC)P2]•+ is a triplet of quintents, resulting form coupling to with 2 P nuclei and a small coupling with 2 N nuclei. NBO analysis showed spin delocalisation across two phosphorus atoms (0.27e each) and nitrogen atoms(0.14e each). Contrastingly, the [(NHC)P2]•+complex showed delocalisation mostly on phosphorus (0.33e and 0.44e) with little contribution of other elements. Other diradicals synthesised by the Bertrand group involved species single phosphorus atoms. These included [(TMP)P(cAAC)]•+ where spin is localised on phosphorus (67%) and [bis(carbene)-PN]•+ with spin density distributed over phosphorus (0.40e), central nitrogen atom (0.18e), and N atom of cAAC (0.19e). Treatment with this later cation with KC8 returns it to its neutral analogue.In 2003, Geoffroy et al. synthesised Mes*P•-(C(NMe2)2)+ through a one electron oxidation of a phosphaalkenes with [Cp2Fe]PF6. A solution of Mes*P•-(C(NMe2)2)+ is stable in inert atmosphere in the solid state for a few weeks and a few days in solution.  Hyperfine couplings on EPR show strong localisation of the spin to the phosphorus nuclei (0.75e in p orbital). In 2015, the Wang group was able to isolate the crystal structure of this species with use of the oxidant of a weakly coordinating anion Ag[Al(ORF)4]-. The electron spin density, found by EPR, resides principally on phosphorus 3p and 3s orbitals (68.2% and 2.46% respectively). This was supported by DFT calculations where 80.9% of spin density was found to be localised on phosphorus atom.  

Weakly coordinating anions were also used to stabilise cyclic biradical cations synthesised by Schulz and colleagues where the spin density was found to reside exclusively on the phosphorus atoms (0.46e each) in the case of [P(μ-NTer)2P]•+. In the case of  [P(μ-NTer)2As]•+ the spin was found to mostly reside on the As nuclei (70.6% on As compared to 29.4% on P atom). Many other cyclic radical cations have been reported.

It is difficult to form radical cations with diphosphenes due to low lying HOMO at the phosphorus centre. Ghadwal and co-workers were able to synthesise a diphosphene radical cation [{(NHC)C(Ph)}P]2•+ using an NHC-derived divinyldiphosphene with a high lying HOMO and an small HOMO-LUMO gap. The stability of the species was identified as the delocalisation of the spin density across the CP2C-unit. The spin density was found to be 11-14% on each P nuclei and 17-21% on each C nuclei.

Structure and properties 

A unique source of stability for phosphorus radical cations is the electrostatic repulsion between radical cations that prevents dimerisation.

Weakly coordinating anions have been used to stabilise biradical cations.

Phosphorus radical anions

Synthesis 
The most common method for accessing radical anions is through the use of reducing agents.

In 2014 the Wang group reported the synthesis of a phosphorus-centred radical anion through the reduction of a phosphalkene using either Li in DME or K in THF yielding purple crystals. EPR data showed localisation of the spin on 3p (51.09%) and 3s (1.62%) orbitals of phosphorus. They later synthesised a diphosphorus-centred radial anion and the first di-radical di-anion from the reduction of the diphosphaalkene with KC8 in THF in the presence of 18-crown-6. In both cases the spin density resides principally on the phosphorus nuclei.

Tan and co-workers used a charge transfer approach to synthesis the phosphorus radical anion coordinated CoII and FeII complexes. Here diazafluorenylidene-substituted phosphaalkene is reacted with low valent transition metal complexes to form phosphorus radical anions coordinated with metal complexes. This species displays a quartet ground state showing weak antiferromagnetic interaction of the phosphorus radical with the high-spim TMII ion. The spin density is mostly localised on TM and phosphorus nuclei. The group further synthesised radical anion lanthanide complexes which also showed antiferromagnetic interaction.

The π-acid properties of boryl substituents were employed by Yamashita and co-workers to stabilise phosphorus radical anions. Here the diazafluorenylidene-substituted phosphaalkene is reacted with [Cp*2Ln][BPh4] (Ln = Dy, Tb, and Gd) followed by reduction with KC8 in the absence or presence of 2,2,2-cryptand yielding complexes with radical anion phosphaalkene fragments. EPR and DFT calculations indicate spin density mostly localised on the P nuclei (67.4%).

Further reading

Reviews

Reactivity

Potential applications

References 

Chemistry
Phosphorus compounds
Free radicals